Zaburze  is a village in the administrative district of Gmina Radecznica, within Zamość County, Lublin Voivodeship, in eastern Poland.

Gallery

References

External links
Unofficial website of Zaburze, in Polish.

Zaburze